This is a list of singles that charted in the top ten of the ARIA Charts in 2009.

Top-ten singles
Key

1991 peaks

2008 peaks

2010 peaks

Entries by artist
The following table shows artists who achieved two or more top 10 entries in 2009, including songs that reached their peak in 2008 and 2010. The figures include both main artists and featured artists. The total number of weeks an artist spent in the top ten in 2009 is also shown.

See also
List of number-one singles of 2009 (Australia)
List of Top 25 singles for 2009 in Australia

Notes

References

Australia Singles top 10
Top 10 singles
Top 10 singles 2009